The 1844 United States presidential election in Georgia took place between November 1 and December 4, 1844, as part of the 1844 United States presidential election. Voters chose 10 representatives, or electors to the Electoral College, who voted for President and Vice President.

Georgia voted for the Democratic candidate, James K. Polk, over Whig candidate Henry Clay. Polk won Georgia by a margin of 2.38%.

Results

References

Georgia
1844
1844 Georgia (U.S. state) elections